Inglis is a surname, derived from Early Modern and Middle English forms of the word English. Notable people with the surname include:

Agnes Inglis (1870–1952), American anarchist
Alexander Inglis (died 1496), Scottish cleric and royal clerk
Alfred Inglis (1856–1919), Kent county cricketer
Amirah Inglis (1926-2015), Australian communist and writer
Anthony Inglis (conductor) (born 1952), English conductor
Anthony Inglis (shipbuilder) (1813–1884), an engineer and shipbuilder.
Bob Inglis (born 1959), US congressman from South Carolina
Brian Inglis (1916–1993), Irish/English journalist
Charles Inglis (c. 1731–1791), Royal Navy officer
Charles Inglis, Royal Navy officer
Charles Inglis (1734–1816), the first Church of England bishop of the Diocese of Nova Scotia
Charles Inglis (1875–1952), British civil engineer and academic
Charles M. Inglis (1870–1954), Indian scientist
Colin James Inglis (1928–2005), English Chief Scout
Esther Inglis (1571–1624), Scottish miniaturist, embroiderer, calligrapher, translator and writer
Elsie Inglis  (1864–1917), Scottish physician
Frank Inglis (1899–1969), Head of RAF Intelligence in WW2
Fred Inglis (born 1937), English academic
Greg Inglis (born 1987), Australian Rugby League player
James Inglis (physician) (1813-1851), Scottish physician, author and geologist
James Inglis  (c. 1922–1951), Scottish murderer
James Charles Inglis (1851–1911), British civil engineer
John Inglis, Lord Glencorse  (1810–1891), Scottish politician and judge
John Inglis (bishop) (1777–1850), Canadian bishop
John Inglis (shipbuilder) (1842–1919), Scottish shipbuilder
John K. Inglis (1933-2011), English biologist and writer
John Eardley Wilmot Inglis (1814–1862), Scottish soldier
John Frederic Inglis (1853–1923), British cricketer, footballer and soldier
John Inglis and William Inglis, Canadian businessmen and head of John Inglis and Company
John C. Inglis (born 1954), American security official
Vice-Admiral Sir John Gilchrist Inglis (1906–1972), British naval officer and head of Naval Intelligence
Judy Inglis (1952–2003), British artist
Julia, Lady Inglis, née Thesiger  (1833–1904), who wrote a diary on the Siege of Lucknow
Ken Inglis (1929-2017), Australian historian
Maddison Inglis (born 1998), Australian tennis player
Mark Inglis (born 1959), New Zealand mountaineer
Neil Inglis (born 1974), Scottish footballer
Rob Inglis (b. 1933), Australian actor, writer, and audiobook narrator
Robert Harry Inglis (1786–1855), English Conservative politician
Rupert Inglis (1863–1916), English international rugby player
Sergt. Inglis, Scottish soldier who played once for Southampton Football Club in 1896
Sheila Legge (née Chetwynd Inglis; c. 1911 – 5 January 1949) 
Simon Inglis (born 1955), English journalist
Stephanie Inglis (born 1988), Scottish judoka
Tony Inglis (1911–1997), Irish/English art director
William Inglis (disambiguation)

See also
Template:Inglis family
Ingles (surname)
English (surname)

Ethnonymic surnames
English-language surnames